The Housemaid can refer to:

 The Housemaid (1960 film), a Korean film
 The Housemaid (1964 film), a Korean film
 The Housemaid (2010 film), a Korean film
 The Housemaid (2016 film), a Vietnamese film